To Forget Venice is a 1979 Italian drama film written and directed by Franco Brusati. It was nominated for the Academy Award for Best Foreign Language Film at the 52nd Academy Awards.

Cast
 Mariangela Melato as Anna
 Eleonora Giorgi as Claudia
 Erland Josephson as Nicky
 Nerina Montagnani as Caterina
 David Pontremoli as Picchio
 Fred Personne as Fossino
 Armando Brancia as Owner of restaurant

Reviews

Roger Ebert in 1980, gave it 2.5 stars out of 4 and said "To Forget Venice doesn't feel like a story, it feels like an idea for a story, and that's the problem with it".

Derek Winnert in 2019 gave it 5 stars out of 5 and said "To Forget Venice [Dimenticare Venezia] is a poignant, telling, superb movie, based on a story by Franco Brusati, which was deservedly Oscar nominated as Best Foreign Language Film in 1979. By rights, it should have won".

Awards
Academy Award nominee: Best Foreign Film
David di Donatello: Best Film
Nastro d'Argento: Best Actress (Mariangela Melato)

See also
 List of submissions to the 52nd Academy Awards for Best Foreign Language Film
 List of Italian submissions for the Academy Award for Best Foreign Language Film
 List of Italian films of 1979

References

External links

1979 films
1979 drama films
1979 LGBT-related films
Italian drama films
Gaumont Film Company films
1970s Italian-language films
Films directed by Franco Brusati
Films scored by Benedetto Ghiglia
1970s Italian films